The Teaching And Learning International Survey (TALIS) is a worldwide evaluation on the conditions of teaching and learning, performed first in 2008. It is coordinated by the Organisation for Economic Co-operation and Development (OECD), with a view to improving educational policies and outcomes.

See also
 Programme for International Student Assessment (PISA)
 Trends in International Mathematics and Science Study (TIMSS)

References

External links
OECD/TALIS website

Educational evaluation methods